The SCTV Awards are annual Indonesian awards that are presented by SCTV, which recognize popularity in the television industry, and which correspond to the SCTV Music Awards (for music). The annual show was first held on August 24, 2001.

Dates and locations

Voting System
The show are voted in by SCTV audiences throughout Indonesia and therefore reflect the popular choices of a significant portion of the television viewing public in the country.

Awards categories
Awards are presented in several categories, including Famous Lead Role Actress, Famous Lead Role Actor, Famous Supporting Role Actor, Famous Supporting Role Actress, Famous Presenter, Famous Singer, Famous Group Band, Famous Advertisement, and Famous Program. The Lifetime Achievement Award is presented to individuals with lifetime dedication to the entertainment industry.

In 2009, the show introduced the Famous Supporting Role Actor and Famous Supporting Role Actress categories.

Winners

2001 SCTV Awards

2002 SCTV Awards

2003 SCTV Awards

2004 SCTV Awards

2005 SCTV Awards

2006 SCTV Awards

2007 SCTV Awards

2008 SCTV Awards

2009 SCTV Awards

2010 SCTV Awards

2011 SCTV Awards

See also

 List of Asian television awards

References

External links
  SCTV Awards

Indonesian awards
Indonesian television awards
SCTV (TV network) original programming